Cadet College Pasrur is a boarding secondary school in Pasrur, Sialkot District, Pakistan.

Background
The federal government approved the project in 2004.

Affiliation
The College is affiliated with the Board of Intermediate and Secondary Education, Gujranwala for the Secondary School Certificate and Higher Secondary School Certificate.

References

External links
Official website

Cadet colleges in Pakistan